T. Joseph Barger is a retired American soccer and lacrosse player who played professionally in the American Professional Soccer League, Major Indoor Soccer League, and USISL.

In 1985, Barger graduated from Fallston High School.  He attended Loyola University Maryland, playing on the men's soccer team from 1985 to 1988 and the men's lacrosse team his senior year.  He graduated in 1989 with a bachelor's degree in finance.

In 1989, the Baltimore Blast selected Barger in the MISL Draft.  He would spend two indoor seasons with the Blast.  In 1990, he signed with the Maryland Bays of the American Professional Soccer League where he played two summer, outdoor seasons.  In 1990, Barger and his team mates won the APSL championship.  In September 1991, Barger retired to pursue a career in the financial industry.  However, he returned in 1993, to play for the Baltimore Bays of the USISL.  He went on to play at least one outdoor and three indoor seasons with the Bays.  On January 7, 1999, the Blast signed Barger to a fifteen-day contract to cover for several injured players.  He saw time in four games before being released.

In 2007, the Maryland Soccer Hall of Fame inducted Barger.

External links
 MISL stats

References

Living people
American soccer players
American Professional Soccer League players
Baltimore Bays (1993–1998) players
Baltimore Blast (1980–1992) players
Baltimore Blast (NPSL) players
Loyola Greyhounds men's soccer players
Major Indoor Soccer League (1978–1992) players
Maryland Bays players
USISL players
People from Fallston, Maryland
Soccer players from Maryland
Association football defenders
Year of birth missing (living people)